Gary Nathaniel Cooper (born December 22, 1956) is a former professional baseball player. He appeared in 21 games in Major League Baseball for the Atlanta Braves in 1980, but came to the plate only twice. Most of his appearances came as either a pinch runner (he was 2-for-3 on stolen base attempts) or as a late-inning defensive replacement in left field.

External links

Major League Baseball outfielders
Atlanta Braves players
BYU Cougars baseball players
Kingsport Braves players
Greenwood Braves players
Savannah Braves players
Durham Bulls players
Baseball players from Savannah, Georgia
1956 births
Living people
All-American college baseball players